Bay Tree is an unincorporated community in northern Alberta in Saddle Hills County, located on Highway 49,  northwest of Grande Prairie.

References

External links
County Website

Localities in Saddle Hills County